Uchan-su can refer to:
 Uchan-su (river), the river that flows through Crimea
 Uchan-su (waterfall), the waterfall in Crimea